Bhaktamara Stotra is a famous Jain Sanskrit prayer. It was composed by Acharya Manatunga (7th century CE). The name Bhaktamara comes from a combination of two Sanskrit names, "Bhakta" (Devotee) and "Amar" (Immortal).

The prayer praises Rishabhanatha (adinath), the first Tirthankara of Jainism in this time cycle. There are 48 verses in total. The last verse gives the name of the author Manatunga. Bhaktamar verses have been recited as a stotra (prayer), and sung as a stavan (hymn), somewhat interchangeably. Other Jain prayers have taken after these (such as the Kalyānamandira stotra, devoted to the twenty-third tirthankara, and the Svayambhu stotra, to all twenty-four); additional verses here praise the omniscience of Adinatha, while devotionals are considered a source for lay understandings of Jain doctrine.

Legend
According to legends, Manatunga Āchārya was chained and imprisoned by the local King Bhoj. Manatunga Āchārya composed this stotra (hymn) in the prison. With the completion of each verse, a chain broke, or a door opened. Manatunga was free when all the verses were finished.

History
Bhakamara Stotra was composed by Manatunga in 6th century CE. Legends associate Manatunga with a ruler named Bhoja. However Manatunga probably lived a few centuries before Raja Bhoja of Dhara. He is identified by some scholars as Kshapanaka, one of the Navaratnas in the court of legendary Vikramaditya. An unidentified Sanskrit poet Matanga, composer of "Brahaddeshi" on music theory, may also have been the same person. Bhaktamara stotra was composed sometime in the Gupta or the post-Gupta period, making Manatunga approximately contemporary with other navaratnas like Kalidasa and Varahamihira. Several spots near Bhopal and Dhar are traditionally associated with Manatunga.

Verses
Bhaktamara Stotra is believed to be at least a thousand years old, though many believe it to be still older. Bhaktamara Stotra has been passed down from generation to generation. It is an ageless panegyric. The importance and effectiveness is believed to have increased with the passage of time. Bhaktamara Stotra is recited by many with religious regularity. The original Stotra is in Sanskrit.

The Bhaktamar Stotra had 52 stanzas earlier but because of their power they were removed and now there are 48 stanzas at present. Every stanza has four parts. Every part has 14 letters. The complete panegyric is formed by 2688 letters.
It is said that some specific stanzas are miraculously effective for fulfilment of different purposes.

Art
Bhaktamara stotra is widely illustrated in paintings. At the Sanghiji temple at Sanganer, there is a panel illustrating each verse.

The verses of Bhaktamar are thought to possess magical properties (tantra). A mystical diagram, yantra, is associated with each verse. "Sadhak Shivaanand Saraswati" (Udayraj Gadnis) has painted a number of yantras associated with Bhaktamar stotra.

There is a temple at Bharuch with a section dedicated to the Bhaktamar and its author Manatunga.

The Bhaktamara Stotra is composed in the meter "Vasantatilka". All the fourteen syllables of this meter are equally divided between short and long syllables i.e. seven laghu and seven gurus and this belongs to sakvari group of meters. 
It is believed that such an equal division into short and long syllables will help an aspirant attain the state of equanimity quickly, the meter itself serving as a catalyst (mantra).

Translations
Bhaktamara Stotra was translated into Braj Bhasha by Hemraj Pande in the style of translation of Kalyanamandir stotra's by Banarsidas.

References

Citations

Sources 
 
 
 

Jain mantras
Devotion songs
Jain texts